Tonopah Valley High School is a high school in Tonopah, Maricopa County, Arizona.

It is part of the Saddle Mountain Unified School District, which also operates Tartesso Elementary School and Ruth Fisher Elementary School on the same campus site, among other schools.

See also

References

External links 
 Official website

Public high schools in Arizona
Schools in Maricopa County, Arizona